Stéphane Da Costa (born 11 July 1989) is a French professional ice hockey player who is currently playing for Avtomobilist Yekaterinburg of the Kontinental Hockey League (KHL). Born in France, Da Costa moved to the United States as a junior to develop as a player. After junior, Da Costa moved on to NCAA collegiate hockey, playing two seasons with Merrimack College. He then signed as a free agent with the National Hockey League (NHL)'s Ottawa Senators in 2011, and played three seasons in the organization, including 47 games with Ottawa. In 2014, he left the organization as a free agent, signing with CSKA Moscow.

Playing career

Amateur
Da Costa moved from his native country of France to the U.S. to play junior hockey for the Texas Tornado of the North American Hockey League (NAHL) at the age of 17, not yet able to speak English fluently. With the Tornado in 2006–07, Da Costa had 23 goals and 40 points in 50 games, tied for third in team scoring.

Da Costa then transitioned to the United States Hockey League (USHL) in 2007–08, joining the Sioux City Musketeers. In his first season with the team, Da Costa had 12 goals and 37 points in 51 games, helping the team qualify for the playoffs. In four post-season games, Da Costa had a goal and three points.

He returned to the USHL's Musketeers for a second season in 2008–09, leading the team in scoring with 31 goals and 67 points in 48 games. Sioux City, however, failed to qualify for the post-season.

Da Costa joined the Merrimack College Warriors of the NCAA's Hockey East conference in North Andover, Massachusetts, for the 2009–10 season. In his second game of his freshman season, Da Costa scored five goals against the United States Military Academy team. He finished the season with 16 goals and 45 points in 34 games. After the season, Da Costa won the National Rookie of the Year, USCHO Rookie of the Year, Inside College Hockey Rookie of the Year, College Hockey News Rookie of the Year and Hockey East Rookie of the Year honours.

After receiving numerous offers from NHL teams to sign as a free agent, Da Costa opted to return to Merrimack for a second season in 2010–11. He once again led the team in scoring with 14 goals and 45 points in 33 games, missing multiple games in February due to a knee injury.

Professional
On 30 March 2011, Da Costa signed as an undrafted free agent with the Ottawa Senators of the NHL. He made his NHL debut in the 2010–11 season, appearing in four games with the Senators and registering no points. His first NHL game was on 2 April 2011, against the rival Toronto Maple Leafs. Da Costa became just the sixth player born in France to play in the NHL, joining Cristobal Huet, Philippe Bozon, Pat Daley, Paul MacLean and André Peloffy, and the third French-born and -trained NHL player (along with Bozon and Huet and before Antoine Roussel, Pierre-Édouard Bellemare, and Yohann Auvitu).

After an impressive training camp to start the 2011–12 season, Da Costa made the Senators' opening night roster and joined the team for their first game. He registered his first NHL point on 8 October in his second game of the season, a goal in a 6–5 loss to the Maple Leafs against goaltender James Reimer. After scoring three goals and five points in 22 games in Ottawa, Da Costa was reassigned to their American Hockey League (AHL) affiliate, the Binghamton Senators, on 27 November 2011. In Binghamton, Da Costa registered 13 goals and 36 points in 46 games, including his first professional hat-trick on 26 December 2011, in an 8–3 Binghamton victory over the Albany Devils.

On 25 July 2012, the Senators announced that they had re-signed Da Costa to a one-year, two-way contract extension. The deal would pay $800,000 if he played in Ottawa, and $80,000 if he returned to Binghamton for a second season. The 2012–13 NHL lockout forced Da Costa to begin the season in Binghamton, where he recorded nine goals and 15 assists in his first 31 games. He was recalled to Ottawa on 3 February 2013, following two-straight losses by the Senators.

On 12 July 2014, Da Costa left North America and signed as a free agent to a one-year contract with CSKA Moscow of the KHL.

On October 14, 2017, Da Costa joined Genève-Servette HC of the National League on a one-year deal worth CHF 800,000.

Returning to the KHL for the 2018–19 season with Russian club, Avtomobilist Yekaterinburg, Da Costa posted 22 goals and 48 points in 58 games. As a free agent at the conclusion of the season, Da Costa opted to continue in the KHL in signing a one-year deal with Lokomotiv Yaroslavl on May 1, 2019. In the following 2019–20 season, Da Costa continued to play in a leading offensive role, posting 14 goals and 35 points in 58 games.

Da Costa left Lokomotiv at the conclusion of his contract, joining AK Bars Kazan on a one-year contract on May 6, 2020. Following a lone season with Ak Bars in 2020–21, in which he led the club in scoring with 27 goals, 30 assists and 57 points in just 52 games, Da Costa returned to former club, Avtomobilist Yekaterinburg, as a free agent in agreeing to a two-year contract on 21 May 2021.

International play
Da Costa plays his international hockey with France, and played in his first international tournament at the 2008 World Junior Ice Hockey Championships – Division I held in Bad Tölz, Germany. In five games with France, Da Costa had five goals and 10 points. France, however, finished with a 1–4–0 record. Da Costa returned for the 2009 World Junior Ice Hockey Championships - Division I held in Herisau, Switzerland, scoring four goals and 13 points in five games and helping France to a 3–2–0 tournament record.

Da Costa also played for France at the 2009 IIHF World Championship held in Bern and Kloten, Switzerland, where he had two assists in six games, as France finished in 12th place. Da Costa was once again named to France for the 2010 IIHF World Championship held in Cologne, Mannheim and Gelsenkirchen, Germany, scoring one goal and three points in five games, though France fell to 14th place.  In the 2011 IIHF World Championship held in Bratislava and Košice, Slovakia, Da Costa was held to just one assist in five games as France finished in 12th place.

Da Costa once again suited up for France at the 2012 IIHF World Championship, scoring a goal and six points in seven games in France's best finish at the Worlds since 1995, ninth place. Da Costa scored the insurance goal for France in a key 4–2 upset of Switzerland.

In the 2014 IIHF World Championship opener for France on 9 May, Da Costa scored two goals in a 3–2 shoot-out victory over Canada, a major upset victory. Da Costa would score twice again in France's 6–2 defeat of Denmark, marking the team's first qualification to the World Championship quarter-finals since 1995.

Personal
A native of Paris, Da Costa is the son of a Portuguese–French father and Polish mother.

Career statistics

Regular season and playoffs

International

Awards and honours

References

External links

1989 births
Living people
Ak Bars Kazan players
Avtomobilist Yekaterinburg players
Binghamton Senators players
HC CSKA Moscow players
French ice hockey centres
French people of Polish descent
French people of Portuguese descent
Genève-Servette HC players
Lokomotiv Yaroslavl players
Merrimack Warriors men's ice hockey players
Ottawa Senators players
Sioux City Musketeers players
Ice hockey people from Paris
Texas Tornado players
Undrafted National Hockey League players
French expatriate sportspeople in Canada
French expatriate sportspeople in Russia
AHCA Division I men's ice hockey All-Americans
French expatriate sportspeople in the United States
French expatriate sportspeople in Switzerland
Expatriate ice hockey players in the United States
Expatriate ice hockey players in Russia
Expatriate ice hockey players in Canada
Expatriate ice hockey players in Switzerland
French expatriate ice hockey people